Ataur Rahman Politician of Gaibandha district of Bangladesh and former member of Parliament for Gaibandha-4 constituency in 1988.

Career 
Rahman was elected to parliament from Gaibandha-4 as an  independent candidate in 1988.

References 

Living people
Year of birth missing (living people)
People from Gaibandha District
4th Jatiya Sangsad members